

Commonly used mechanical switches on pre-built keyboards 

Manufacturers frequently build computer keyboards using switches from original equipment manufacturers (OEMs). The switches used determine the feel of the keyboard.

Mechanical keyboard switches for custom keyboards 
On the custom mechanical keyboard space there are far greater quantity of keyboard switches. It is important to note that these do not portray the diversity and number of switches currently on the market.

Future 
As time goes on, there are more and more switches being developed and manufactured across the world. Some are by new manufacturers, some are collaborations between companies and manufacturers, and some are consumer made. It is hard to really keep up with the amount of switches, but there are some  bigger databases that involve more than just our main manufacturers listed here.

On top of a variety of new switches being made, consumers are taking parts of different switches and than going on to make their own switches, called “Franken-switches” These switch ‘ideas’ are starting to take over the community, as consumers love to mix different materials with others to really get a sound and feel that they feel is just ‘right.’

References

Computer keyboards
Lists of computer hardware